John M. Gilroy (born June 24, 1959) is an American film editor whose work includes Michael Clayton, The Bourne Legacy, Warrior, Pacific Rim, Nightcrawler and Suicide Squad.

Life and career
Gilroy was born in 1959 in Santa Monica, California. He is the son of Ruth Dorothy (Gaydos), a sculptor and writer, and Frank D. Gilroy, a filmmaker. He is the twin brother of screenwriter-director Dan Gilroy and the brother of screenwriter-director Tony Gilroy. He has a daughter, Carolyn, born in 1990.

John did not originally plan to enter the film industry. He studied government at Dartmouth College with the intention of continuing on to attend law school, but eventually decided to pursue a career in film rather than law. He moved to New York City, where he worked as a bartender for two years before landing his first job as an assistant editor under Rick Shaine on the 1984 adaptation of Herb Gardner's play The Goodbye People. He was an editorial assistant on several films made throughout the 1980s, including Francis Ford Coppola's Peggy Sue Got Married (1986) and Gardens of Stone (1987). His first film as the primary editor was The Luckiest Man in the World (1989), which was written and directed by his father.

Gilroy also edited films including Billy Madison (1995), Shadow Magic (2000), Suspect Zero (2004) and Trust the Man (2005). He worked with his brother Tony Gilroy, a screenwriter and director, for the first time on Tony's film Michael Clayton (2007). The film received seven Academy Award nominations and John's editing was nominated for a BAFTA Award and an American Cinema Editors Eddie Award. John and Tony later collaborated on Duplicity (2009) and The Bourne Legacy (2012). In 2014 John worked with his other brother, fraternal twin Dan Gilroy, also a screenwriter and director, as the editor of Nightcrawler, for which he was nominated for an Independent Spirit Award for Best Editing. He has edited films for every member of his immediate family—his father and both brothers—except his mother. He has also worked often with director Gavin O'Connor, and edited Phillip Noyce's Salt (2010) and Guillermo del Toro's Pacific Rim (2013).

Filmography

Films

Television series

References

External links

Living people
1959 births
American Cinema Editors
Dartmouth College alumni
People from Santa Monica, California
People from Washingtonville, New York
Fraternal twins